Pavle Popara (born 20 May 1987 in Kragujevac) is a Serbian former footballer.

Career
Popara started his career with Partizan Belgrade but could not break his way into the first team. He failed to make a single appearance in the Serbian SuperLiga.

In January 2006, Popara was signed by Greek side Apollon Kalamarias. He made his debut in the Superleague Greece on 12 March 2006, in a 2–1 away loss against Olympiacos, coming on as a substitute for Aílton. Popara made a further two league appearances in 2005–06 season. He managed just six more league appearances during the following season before joining Panetolikos on loan in January 2007.

In the summer of 2007, Popara moved to Cyprus to play for Enosis Neon Paralimni but failed to establish himself in the team.

In June 2008, Popara joined Bulgarian A Professional Football Group side Slavia Sofia.

References

External links
 
 

1987 births
Living people
Serbian footballers
Serbian expatriate footballers
Association football midfielders
Enosis Neon Paralimni FC players
Panetolikos F.C. players
Apollon Pontou FC players
PFC Slavia Sofia players
FC Astra Giurgiu players
Pogoń Szczecin players
FK Radnički Niš players
Orange County SC players
USL Championship players
Expatriate footballers in Greece
Expatriate footballers in Cyprus
Expatriate footballers in Bulgaria
Serbian expatriate sportspeople in Bulgaria
Expatriate footballers in Romania
Expatriate footballers in Poland
Expatriate soccer players in the United States
First Professional Football League (Bulgaria) players
Liga I players
Ekstraklasa players
Cypriot First Division players
Sportspeople from Kragujevac